Theatr Genedlaethol Cymru is the Welsh language national theatre of Wales, founded in 2003. It has a counterpart in National Theatre Wales, the English language national theatre company of Wales, founded in 2009. Together the two theatre companies provide a national platform for drama in Wales.

Theatr Genedlaethol Cymru attempts to shape a distinctive identity for drama in Welsh while also opening it up to outside linguistic and dramatic influences.

Artistic Directors
Cefin Roberts (2003-2010)
Arwel Gruffydd (2011-2022)
Steffan Donnelly

References

National theatres
Theatre companies in Wales